Soriano nel Cimino is a town and comune in the province of Viterbo, Lazio, central Italy.

The town is overlooked by Monte Cimino, the highest peak in the Monti Cimini.

Main sights
The Orsini Castle, built by Orso Orsini in  the 13th century. It was the summer residence of Pope Nicholas III, uncle of Orso. It was a high security castle until the 1990s and is now managed by the Tuscia University.
The Palazzo Chigi-Albani (16th century), designed by  Ottaviano Schiratti. The interior houses the  Papacqua Fountain.
The small Romanesque church of San Giorgio (11th century).
Cathedral (Duomo), of San Nicola di Bari from 1794.
Church of Sant'Eutizio.
Fontana Vecchia ("Old Fountain"), built in the 15th century.
Porta Romana  ("Roman Gate"), a copy of the Porta Pia in Rome.
SUBLIMAZIONE (Urban Sculpture), a permanent installation by Giorgio Capogrossi (Montez) - Piazzale Cavalieri di Vittorio Veneto

External links
 About Soriano nel Cimino - Information for visitors to Soriano, organized tours & cooking classes
 Culture Discovery Vacations - A cooking and culinary tour company that explores Tuscany and Umbria, based in Soriano nel Cimino 

Cities and towns in Lazio